Mabo Ismaila (15 July 1944 – 13 March 2023) was a Nigerian football manager.

Career
Ismaila was the head coach of the Nigeria women's national team at the 1999 FIFA Women's World Cup, 2000 Summer Olympics and 2004 Summer Olympics. He led Nigeria to the quarter-finals of the World Cup, the team's best ever result.

Personal life and death 
Ismaila confirmed that he was ill to The Punch in January 2023, following the death of his wife. He died on 13 March 2023, at the age of 78.

References

External links
 
 
 Mabo Ismaila at Soccerdonna.de 

1944 births
2023 deaths
Nigerian football managers
Women's association football managers
Nigeria women's national football team managers
1999 FIFA Women's World Cup managers